Jebel Al Wakrah is a hill and local landmark of the city of Al Wakrah on the eastern coast of Qatar. It was formed almost entirely from wind-blown deposits. 

According to the Ministry of Municipality and Environment, the city of Al Wakrah derived its name from a hill that was a popular nesting spot for birds (bird's nest transliterates to "wakar" in Arabic), most likely referring to Jebel Al Wakrah. 

Archaeological artifacts were uncovered at the jebel by the Danish archaeological expedition during the 1950s and 1960s and by the British Mission led by Beatrice de Cardi in 1973.

References

Hills of Qatar
Al Wakrah